Charles John Robert Hepburn-Stuart-Forbes-Trefusis, 21st Baron Clinton  (18 January 1863 – 5 July 1957) was a British peer.

Trefusis was the eldest son of the 20th Baron Clinton and his wife, Harriet. Educated at Oxford he played polo with the University team and won the Varsity Match against Cambridge in 1883. On 1 June 1886, he married Lady Jane McDonnell (15 June 1863 – 27 August 1953) (a daughter of the 5th Earl of Antrim) and they had two daughters:

Harriet (14 November 1887 – 15 March 1958), married Major Henry Nevile Fane (1883 – 2 August 1947). They had seven children.
Fenella (19 August 1889 – 19 July 1966), married John Herbert Bowes-Lyon. They had five children.

From 1898 until he succeeded to his father's title in 1904, Trefusis was Convener of Kincardineshire County Council. In 1911, Lord Clinton was admitted to the Duchy of Cornwall Council and was appointed the duchy's Keeper of the Privy Seal in 1913 and Lord Warden of the Stannaries in 1921. From 1918 to 1919, he was Joint Parliamentary Secretary to the Board of Agriculture and Fisheries, Chairman of the Forestry Commission from 1927 to 1929, and a director of the Southern Railway. Lord Clinton had also been admitted to the Privy Council in 1927 and on his retirement in 1933, he was appointed a GCVO.

Upon Lord Clinton's death in 1957, his title became abeyant between his two daughters until it was called out of abeyance for his great-grandson (by Harriet), Gerard Fane-Trefusis, 22nd Baron Clinton, in 1965.

References

Sources
Burke's Peerage & Gentry

Members of the Privy Council of the United Kingdom
Knights Grand Cross of the Royal Victorian Order
1863 births
1957 deaths
Barons Clinton
Conservative Party (UK) hereditary peers